This article listed the confirmed squads lists for 2008 Thomas & Uber Cup between May 11 and May 18, 2008.

Teams with Thomas and Uber Cup squads

China

Men
Lin Dan
Bao Chunlai
Chen Jin
Chen Yu
Cai Yun
Fu Haifeng
Xie Zhongbo
Guo Zhendong
He Hanbin
Shen Ye

Women
Xie Xingfang
Lu Lan
Zhu Lin
Jiang Yanjiao
Yang Wei
Zhang Jiewen
Wei Yili
Zhang Yawen
Gao Ling
Zhao Tingting

Denmark

Men
Kenneth Jonassen
Peter Gade
Joachim Persson
Jan Ø. Jørgensen
Jonas Rasmussen
Lars Paaske
Jens Eriksen
Martin Lundgaard Hansen
Carsten Mogensen
Mathias Boe

Women
Tine Rasmussen
Camilla Sorensen
Nanna Brosolat Jansen
Mie Schjott Kristensen
Marie Ropke
Lena Frier Kristiansen
Kamilla Rytter Juhl
Helle Nielsen
Christinna Pedersen
Line Kruse

Germany

Men
Marc Zwiebler
Roman Spitko
Dieter Domke
Sven Eric Kastens
Marcel Reuter
Michael Fuchs
Ingo Kindervater
Kristof Hopp
Tim Dettmann
Johannes Schoettler

Women
Xu Huaiwen
Juliane Schenk
Janet Köhler
Carola Bott
Karin Schnaase
Nicole Grether
Carina Mette
Birgit Overzier
Michaela Peiffer
Kathrin Piotrowski

Japan

Men
Shoji Sato
Sho Sasaki
Kenichi Tago
Hiroyuki Endo
Keita Masuda
Tadashi Ohtsuka
Shuichi Sakamoto
Shintaro Ikeda
Keishi Kawaguchi
Naoki Kawamae

Women
Eriko Hirose
Kaori Mori
Yu Hirayama
Kaori Imabeppu
Kumiko Ogura
Reiko Shiota
Satoko Suetsuna
Miyuki Maeda
Tomomi Matsuda
Mami Naito

Korea

Men
Park Sung-hwan
Lee Hyun-il
Shon Seung-mo
Hong Ji-hoon
Lee Jae-jin
Jung Jae-sung
Hwang Ji-man
Lee Yong-dae

Women
Hwang Hye-youn
Lee Yun-hwa
Jang Soo-young
Lee Kyung-won
Lee Hyo-jung
Kim Min-jung
Ha Jung-eun

Jun Jae-youn withdrew due to injury

Malaysia

Men
Lee Chong Wei
Wong Choong Hann
Muhammad Hafiz Hashim
Mohd Arif Abdul Latif
Choong Tan Fook
Lee Wan Wah
Koo Kien Keat
Tan Boon Heong
Mohd Fairuzizuan Mohd Tazari
Mohd Zakry Abdul Latif

Women
Wong Mew Choo
Julia Wong Pei Xian
Lydia Cheah Li Ya
Tee Jing Yi
Chin Eei Hui
Wong Pei Tty
Lim Pek Siah
Ng Hui Lin
Chong Sook Chin
Woon Khe Wei

Indonesia

Men
Sony Dwi Kuncoro
Taufik Hidayat
Simon Santoso
Tommy Sugiarto
Markis Kido
Hendra Setiawan
Joko Riyadi
Hendra Aprida Gunawan
Candra Wijaya
Nova Widianto

Women
Maria Kristin Yulianti
Adriyanti Firdasari
Pia Zebadiah
Fransisca Ratnasari
Lilyana Natsir
Vita Marissa
Greysia Polii
Jo Novita
Rani Mundiasti
Endang Nursugianti

New Zealand

Men
John Moody
Joe Wu
Kevin Dennerly-Minturn
Craig Cooper
Henry Tam
Nathan Hannam

Women
Rachel Hindley
Michelle Chan
Jessica Jonggowisastro
Danielle Barry
Emma Rodgers
Renee Flavell
Donna Cranston

Teams with Thomas Cup squads only

Canada
Andrew Dabeka
Bobby Milroy
Stephan Wojcikiewicz
David Snider
Mike Beres
William Milroy
Toby Ng
Alvin Lau

England
Andrew Smith
Rajiv Ouseph
Nathan Rice
Ben Beckman
Dean George
Chris Adcock
Robert Adcock
Chris Langridge
Robin Middleton
Andrew Ellis

Nigeria
Greg Okuonghae
Akeem Ogunseye
Ibrahim Adamu
Jimkan Bulus
Ola Fagbemi
Paul Fagbemi

Thailand
Boonsak Ponsana
Poompat Sapkulchananart
Tanongsak Saensomboonsuk
Pakkawat Vilailak
Sudket Prapakamol
Nuttaphon Narkthong
Songphon Anugritayawon
Tesana Panvisvas
Nitipong Saengsila

Teams with Uber Cup squads only

Hong Kong
Wang Chen
Yip Pui Yin
Mong Kwan Yi
Ng Ka Shun
Tse Ying Suet
Chan Hung Yung
Fungying
Chan Tsz Ka
Chau Hoi Wah
Koon Wai Chee

Netherlands
Yao Jie
Judith Meulendijks
Rachel van Cutsen
Karina de Wit
Patty Stolzenbach
Ginny Severien
Wong Yik Man
Eefje Muskens
Ilse Vaessen
Paulien van Dooremalen

South Africa
Michelle Edwards
Stacey Doubell
Jade Morgan
Chantal Botts
Kerry-Lee Harrington
Annari Viljoen

United States
Eva Lee
Lauren Todt
Chen Kuei Ya
Rena Wang
Panita Phongasavithas
Mesinee Mangkalakiri
Vimla Phongasavithas

References

Thomas andAmp Uber Cup Squads, 2008